The 2019 Indonesia President's Cup was the fourth edition of Indonesia President's Cup, held by the Football Association of Indonesia (PSSI) as a pre-season tournament for the 2019 Liga 1. The tournament started on 2 March and finished on 12 April 2019.

Persija were the defending champions, but they were eliminated in the quarter-finals by Kalteng Putra.

Arema won the finals 4–2 on aggregate against Persebaya for their second Indonesia President's Cup title.

Teams 
The following 20 teams (18 from Liga 1 and two from Liga 2) participated for the tournament.

Notes

Draw 
The draw of the tournament was held on 19 February 2019 at the Sultan Hotel, Senayan in Jakarta. The draw resulted in the following groups:

Venues 
Unlike the previous three seasons, all the venues for the group stage were on the Java Island. The five venues that use for the group stage of the tournament were Patriot Candrabhaga Stadium in Bekasi, Jalak Harupat Stadium in Bandung, Moch. Soebroto Stadium in Magelang, Maguwoharjo Stadium in Sleman, and Kanjuruhan Stadium in Malang.

Format 
In this tournament, 20 teams were drawn into five groups consisting of four teams each. The teams in each group would play a round robin system. After the group stage, the five group winners and three best runners-up would advance to the knockout stage, starting with the quarter-finals. If the quarter-final matches were held in one venue in the previous season, then the matches would be held in group stage winners' home stadium according to the quarter-finals drawing results this season. Two teams qualified for the finals would be played two-legged fixtures and there was no third-place play-off match.

Group stage 
The top teams of each group and the three best runner-up teams advanced to the quarter-finals.

All times are local, WIB (UTC+7).

Group A

Group B

Group C

Group D

Group E

Ranking of runners-up

Knockout stage 
Referring to tournament regulations, the teams entitled to host the quarter-finals were the four best group winners. Therefore, Bhayangkara, Persija, Persela, and Persebaya were the hosts. The draw for the quarter-finals was held on 19 March 2019 at Sultan Hotel, Senayan in Jakarta.

Extra time would not be played in the quarter-finals. If a match ended with a draw, it would go straight to a penalty shoot-out to determine the winner. The away goals rule, extra time and a penalty shoot-out would be used in the semi-finals and finals, if necessary.

All times are local, WIB (UTC+7).

Bracket

Quarter-finals

Semi-finals 

Persebaya won 4–2 on aggregate.

Arema won 6–0 on aggregate.

Finals 

Arema won 4–2 on aggregate.

Statistics

Goalscorers

Awards 
 Best supporter was awarded to Persija's supporter, The Jak Mania.
 Best referee was awarded to Nusur Fadillah.
 Best young player was awarded to Irfan Jaya (Persebaya).
 Top scorer were awarded to Bruno Matos (Persija), Manuchekhr Dzhalilov (Persebaya), and Ricky Kayame (Arema) with five goals each.
 Fair play team was awarded to Persija.
 Best player was awarded to Hamka Hamzah (Arema).

Tournament team rankings 
As per statistical convention in football, matches decided in extra time were counted as wins and losses, while matches decided by penalty shoot-outs were counted as draws.

References 

Piala Presiden
Piala Presiden